M2: Descending into Madness is the second and final solo album by ex-Crimson Glory frontman Midnight, released posthumously five years after his death in 2009. This album was originally released in limited edition back in 2006 and still being worked on for an open edition one year later.

Track listing
All lyrics by Midnight. All music by Midnight except as noted.

Personnel 
 Midnight - All vocals, acoustic guitars
 Lee Harrison - Guitars, bass, drums, keys, fx, lute
 Matt LaPorte - Guitars, bass, mandolin, keys, programming
 Phil Anderson - Hammered dulcimer and percussion
 John Zahner - Keyboards
 Zane Black - Keyboards
 Ronnie Dee - Saxophone on "Cold Caves"

References

Midnight (musician) albums
2014 albums